Boneh-ye Abbas (also Romanized as Boneh-ye ‘Abbās; also known as Boneh-ye ‘Abbāsī) is a village in Shabankareh Rural District, Shabankareh District, Dashtestan County, Bushehr Province, Iran. At the 2006 census, its population was 103, in 20 families.

References 

Populated places in Dashtestan County